Leila Hatami (born October 1, 1972) is an Iranian actress. She has received numerous accolades, including a Silver Bear, two Crystal Simorghs, two Hafez Awards, two Iran Cinema Celebration Awards and three Iran's Film Critics and Writers Association Awards. In 2012, the Government of France has awarded her the Legion of Honour.

Early life
Hatami was born in Tehran. She is the daughter of influential Iranian director Ali Hatami and actress Zari Khoshkam. After finishing high school, she moved to Lausanne, Switzerland and started her studies in Mechanical engineering at the Swiss Federal Institute of Technology in Lausanne (EPFL). After two years she changed her major to French literature. After completing her studies, she returned to live in Iran.

Career
Hatami played several small roles in her father's productions throughout her youth, including in the Hezar Dastan television series and the Kamalolmolk movie. Her first leading film appearance was the title role in the 1997 film Leila, directed by Dariush Mehrjui. She received the Diploma of Honor for Best Actress from the 15th Fajr Film Festival. Following this, she continued to act regularly in Iranian cinema.

She has starred in dozens of films, and has often garnered critical acclaim and accolades. For her performance in The Deserted Station (2002), she was nominated for the Fajr Film Festival Award for Best Actress and she won the Best Actress Award at the 26th Montreal World Film Festival.

She has appeared in her husband's films as a director, Portrait of a Lady Far Away (2005) and The Last Step (2012). She also designed the sets and the costumes of The Last Step and, in addition to receiving the Karlovy Vary International Film Festival Award for Best Actress for her performance, she received a nomination for the Crystal Simorgh Fajr Film Festival Award for Best Production Design and Costume Design for her work on the film.

In 2012, she received international attention for her role in the critical acclaimed Asghar Farhadi film, A Separation, which won dozens of accolades, including the Academy Award for Best Foreign Language Film. Her performance earned critical acclaim and various awards, including the Silver Bear Award for Best Actress at the Berlin Film Festival. IndieWire praised her portrayal as one of the best female performances of the 21st century.

In April 2014, she was announced as a member of the main competition jury at the 2014 Cannes Film Festival. Whilst there, she greeted Cannes President Gilles Jacob with a kiss on the cheek, which is a form of greeting in France. Iran's Deputy Culture Minister Hossein Noushabadi offered criticism of her for this:

"I hope that those who attend international arenas as Iranian women would be careful about the chastity and dignity of Iranians so that the image of the Iranian woman is not tainted before the world," he said. "If they respect Islamic norms and the national culture and beliefs of Iran, it would be a desirable thing for Iranian celebrities to go abroad, but if their presence lacks regard for social values and ethical criteria, the Iranian nation is not going to accept it."

In May 2014, after receiving significant backlash for the kiss in Iran—including calls for her to be flogged—Hatami later apologized for her actions in a letter.

Personal life 
She married her co-star in Leila (Ali Mosaffa) in 1998. They have two children: a son named Mani (born February 2007) and a daughter named Asal (born October 2008).

Beside her native Persian language she is fluent in French, English, and German.

Filmography

Film

Web

Television

References

External links

 
 Interview with Leila Hatami, Leila Hatami answers your questions, BBC Persian, 31 January 2006: Text, Voice.
 Script of Shāer-e Zobāle-hā (شاعر زباله ها), by Mohsen Makhmalbaf: . 
 An unofficial fan site: Leila-Hatami.com 

1972 births
Iranian television actresses
Iranian film actresses
Actresses from Tehran
Living people
Silver Bear for Best Actress winners
Iranian expatriates in Switzerland
Iranian child actresses
20th-century Iranian actresses
21st-century Iranian actresses
Crystal Simorgh for Best Actress winners
École Polytechnique Fédérale de Lausanne alumni